José Santos González Vera (2 November 1897 – 27 February 1970) was a Chilean anarchist writer. He won the Chilean National Prize for Literature in 1950.

Biography 
González Vera was born on 2 November 1897 in San Francisco del Monte, a small town southern Santiago, the capital city of Chile. In 1903 his family moved to Talagante, also a small town in the area.

When González Vera was 11, he travelled to Santiago to attend Liceo Valentín Letelier (Valentin Letelier High School). After one year, he could not pass his classes and quit school.

At the age of 13, he starts to work: he was a painter apprentice, tailor shop assistant, bargain sale's assistant, smelting worker, hairdresser, shoeshine boy, secretary in a butcher's society, commission agent, cashier and trolley's money collector in Valparaiso.

Those experiences led him to become an anarchist: "I was a young man when I had to work in different things to survive. This is how I met different workers who wanted to establish an igualitarian and free society, the way anarchist thinks it should be. Soon after that, I started to dream about it too, because nothing helps you the most to make up your mind about those things than youth"

González Vera became interested in literature when he was 20. He read the work of Maxim Gorki and Peter Kropotkin, one of the most important theorist of anarchism. Right after that, he started writing to expand the ideology of "giving a righter order to society".

José Santos was the founder member and the writer of La Pluma (The Feather), along with Manuel Rojas; and Numen. He collaborated with Claridad (Clarity), a journal of the Student Federation of the Universidad de Chile. He also wrote for the journal Atenea, in the city of Concepcion.

During the persecution of the Student Federation of the Universidad de Chile in 1920, after the Don Ladislao's war, he travels to the southern part of the country, where he meets a young Pablo Neruda and the well known poet Gabriela Mistral.

He got married with the teacher and communist party member María Marchant in 1932. They had two kids, Álvaro and María Elena. 

1897 births
1970 deaths
Chilean male writers
National Prize for Literature (Chile) winners

Chilean anarchists